Thomas Andersen (born 10 April 1961) is a sailor from Fredericia, Denmark, who represented his country at the 1984 Summer Olympics in Los Angeles, United States as crew member in the Soling. With helmsman Jesper Bank and fellow crew member Jan Mathiasen they took the 12th place.

References

Living people
1961 births
Sailors at the 1984 Summer Olympics – Soling
Olympic sailors of Denmark
Danish male sailors (sport)
People from Fredericia
Sportspeople from the Region of Southern Denmark